The Michelsen's Cabinet was a Norwegian cabinet, formed by a coalition of the Liberal Party, the Conservative Party, the Moderate Liberal Party and the Coalition Party. It governed Norway between 11 March 1905 and 23 October 1907. It entered office as part of the build-up for the dissolution of the union between Norway and Sweden in 1905. It had the following composition:

Cabinet members

|}

Other
The State Secretary title is not to be confused with the modern title State Secretary. The old title State Secretary, used between 1814 and 1925, is now known as Secretary to the Government (Regjeringsråd).

State Secretary:
Halfdan Lehmann, – 1 February 1906
Nils Otto Hesselberg, 1 February 1906 –
Director General in Stockholm
August Sibbern, in office until the office was abolished in 1906.
Secretary to the President of the Norwegian Government
Paul Ivar Paulsen, in office until the office was abolished in 1906.

References
Christian Michelsen's Government. 11 March 1905 – 23 October 1907 - Government.no

Notes

Michelsen
Michelsen
Michelsen
Michelsen
1905 establishments in Norway
1907 disestablishments in Norway
Cabinets established in 1905
Cabinets disestablished in 1907